Purley may refer to:

People 
Purley (name), including a list of people and fictional characters with the name

Places 
Purley, London, England
Purley railway station
Purley Way, out-of-town retail area
Purley on Thames, Berkshire, England
Purley, North Carolina, United States
Purley, Texas, United States

See also 
 
 Purleigh, Essex, England
 Pearly (disambiguation)